Bateshwor (Nepali: बटेश्वर ) is a municipality in Danusha District in Province  No. 2 of Nepal. It was formed in 2016 occupying current 5 sections (wards) from previous 5 VDCs. It occupies an area of 31.66 sq. km with a total population of 21,530.

References 

Populated places in Dhanusha District
Rural municipalities of Nepal established in 2017
Rural municipalities in Madhesh Province